The Redneck Performing Arts Association, or RPAA for short, is a group of Clemson, South Carolina patrons of the ESSO Club, a gas and grocery turned sports bar on the Old Greenville Highway (recently renamed Walter T. Cox Boulevard after a former Clemson University dean and president), who have sponsored a three-day music festival in August since 1981 to raise money for charity.

Spittoono (or Spitoono as it is dubbed in alternating years), features local bands who perform for free for the exposure.  No admission is charged to the family-friendly event, held since 1991 at the Clemson National Guard Armory in Pendleton, South Carolina.  Charity dollars are raised through the sale of annual tee-shirts, and of cold beverages. As of 1982, the RPAA was chartered as a 501(c)(3) charity organization. From 1981 to 1990, the event was held in the parking lot of the ESSO Club, but it eventually outgrew the available space there.  The name is a tongue-in-cheek reference to the Spoleto cultural arts festival held each year in Charleston, South Carolina.

Over $60,000 has been donated to regional charities by the RPAA over the years.

Performing arts in South Carolina